Climbing perch may refer to:

Anabantidae, a family of fishes
Anabas testudineus, an Anabantidae native to Asia
Ctenopoma multispine, an Ananbantidae native to Africa